Verdone is a surname. Notable people with the surname include:

Carlo Verdone (born 1950), Italian actor, screenwriter and film director
Jordan Verdone (born 1989), Canadian football player
 (born 1953), Italian film director

See also
Verdicchio